Kong Pui or Kong Pui Tsuen is a village in Sha Tin District, Hong Kong.

Administration
Kong Pui Tsuen is a recognized village under the New Territories Small House Policy.

See also
 Kwun Yam Shan (Sha Tin District)

References

External links
 Delineation of area of existing village Kwun Yam Shan and Kong Pui (Sha Tin) for election of resident representative (2019 to 2022)

Villages in Sha Tin District, Hong Kong